Artix Linux (or simply Artix ) is a rolling-release distribution based on Arch Linux that uses inits such as OpenRC, runit, s6, or Dinit, as opposed to Arch Linux's init systemd.

Artix Linux has its own package repositories but, as a pacman-based distribution, can use packages from Arch Linux repositories or any other derivative distribution, even packages explicitly depending on systemd. The Arch User Repository (AUR) can also be used.

Arch OpenRC began in 2012 and Manjaro OpenRC was subsequently developed alongside it. In 2017 these projects merged to create Artix Linux.

Release history 
Artix initially offered two installation environments, a base command-line ISO image and the graphical Calamares installer based on LXQt desktop, with an i3 version following later. Those early versions featured the OpenRC init system. The latest installation media are available in a variety of desktop environments like LXDE, XFCE, MATE, Cinnamon and KDE Plasma 5. Additionally, two unofficial community editions featuring GTK and Qt desktops and a larger software base are offered, aiming at too-busy-to-customise or less experienced users. All current installation media come in OpenRC, runit, s6, and dinit versions.

Reception 
An early review published on DistroWatch on 27 November 2017 found a few bugs, but overall "Artix is working with a good idea [...] It's minimal, it is rolling and it offers a little-used init system. All of these I think make the project worthwhile." More critical, another review at the time from linux-community.de concluded "the results so far are not exactly motivating." Much more favourable reviews were later featured in both sites. A review from Softpedia gave Artix a 5 out of 5 stars rating, noting its "beautiful and pleasant graphical environments." Distrowatch readers' reviews on Distrowatch are mostly very favourable, with an average rating of 9.0.

Notes

References

External links
 
 Artix wiki
 
 Feature story in Distrowatch weekly
 pro-linux.de review (in German)
 Softpedia review
 2018 linux-community.de review (in German)
 2020 linux-community.de review (in German)

Arch-based Linux distributions
Linux distributions without systemd
Rolling Release Linux distributions
Linux distributions